Howden Edge is a peak in the north-east of the Upper Derwent Valley area of the Peak District National Park in England. At , it is the second-highest marked point within South Yorkshire, after Margery Hill .

It is north-east of Howden Reservoir and north of Abbey Brook.

Hills and edges of South Yorkshire